The Kochi Bypass is a segment of NH66(National Highway 66) that bypasses the CBD of the city of Kochi in Kerala, India. The highway stretches 17 km from Edapally in the Ernakulam district to Aroor in Alappuzha district , via. Palarivattom, Vyttila, Kundannoor, Madavana, Kumbalam. The Government of Kerala began the preliminary works in 1973. After a slow progress, it was partially opened for traffic in the beginning years of the 1980s. The section between Edapally and Vyttila had four lanes from the beginning. The rest of the carriageway was also upgraded to  different sections of 4 lane, 5lane and 6 lanes by 2010

The idea was to bypass the truck traffic out of the city proper. However now the city has outgrown the bypass leading to a heavy suburban traffic. Today, this road has turned out to be the most important arterial road in Kochi. The spacious road is going to replace the MG Road as the state's major commercial avenue in a few years time. Space crunch has really started to take toll on the MG Road, and the NH Bypass provides answer to all the problems faced by the former. Bypass Road has enough width to make the entire stretch into 6lane with service roads and a median. This 17-km stretch of road running across the city has become the hub of business for the city. This road Edapally - Aroor bypass is expected to slowly overtake MG road as the commercial hotspot of Kochi City and also Kerala state.

The S.A.Road & Kaniyampuzha Road connects the stretch with Vyttila Mobility Hub (Said to be the biggest & most important Transport Hub of Kochi and one of the largest bus terminal in India).

Congested Roads
According to a survey conducted in 2016, Edappally-Aroor National Highway stretch carries over 77,000 passenger car units daily. An elevated four-lane corridor is being planned on the Bypass to accommodate the ever-increasing number of vehicles. A detailed project report (DPR) is being readied on how to decongest the stretch which carries over 77,000 passenger car units (PCUs) daily. Over one lakh PCUs cross junctions on the corridor. All this calls for an eight-lane highway. Widening the existing four-lane stretch is a tough proposition since both sides of the 16-km-long stretch are heavily built up. An ideal way according to N.H.A.I to decongest the ever-busy stretch that carries inter and intra-State vehicles, which include national permit, container, tipper and tanker lorries, is to build a four-lane elevated highway. The cost per km will come to around ₹120 crore. The NHAI has proposed to take a final decision after Feedback Infra Private Limited submits its DPR shortly on developing the stretch.

Junctions

 Edappally Junction (Towards Kaloor, Kalamassery and Cheranallur)
 Palarivattom Junction (Towards Kakkanad and Kaloor)
 Vytilla Junction (Towards Kadavanthra and Tripunithura)
 Kundannoor Junction (Towards Maradu and Thevara)
 Madavana Junction (Towards Panangad and Nettoor)
 Aroor Junction (Towards Aroor, Alleppey and Edakochi)

Educational Instiute
Kerala University of Fisheries and Ocean Studies,Panangad, Kochi

Shopping Malls
 LuLu Mall, Kochi
 Oberon Mall, Kochi 
 Gold Souk Grande, Kochi
 Grand Mall, Kochi
Prestige TMS Square, Kochi

Major hotels
 Marriott, Edappally, Kochi
 Holiday Inn, Vennala, Kochi
 Crowne Plaza, Kundannoor, Kochi
 Le Méridien, Kundannoor, Kochi
 Hotel White Fort, Maradu, Kochi
 Starlit Suites, Maradu, Kochi

Automobile showrooms
Since late 2012 this stretch is widely being recognized for large number of vehicle showrooms being opened in the entire stretch. 
 Audi
 Volkswagen
 BMW
 Porsche
 Toyota
 Mercedes-Benz
 Honda
 Mahindra
 Hyundai
 Ford
 Tata Motors
 Jaguar
 Isuzu Motors
 Land Rover
 Volvo
 Chevrolet
 Maruti Suzuki
 Skoda
 Nexa
 Ashok Leyland
 Piaggio
 Renault
 Fiat
 Mitsubishi
 Nissan
 Datsun
 Aprilia Motorcycles
 KTM Motorcycles
 Harley Davidson Motorcycles
 Triumph Motorcycles
 Royal Enfield Motorcycles
 Ducati Motorcycles
 Bajaj Motorcycles
 Yamaha Motorcycles
 Suzuki Motorcycles
 Hero Motorcycles

References

NH bypasses in Kerala
Roads in Kochi
National Highways in Kerala